Friedrich VI, Count of Zollern (died: 4 May 1298), also known as Friedrich the Knight, or Friedrich the Elder, was a Count of Hohenzollern

Life 
Friedrich was a son of Count Friedrich V of Hohenzollern from his marriage to Udilhild of Dillingen.  He succeeded his father around 1288 as Count of Zollern. Later that year, he divided his inheritance with his younger brother Friedrich the Younger.  Friedrich VI kept the County of Zollern, while his younger brother received the Lordships of Schalksburg and Mühlheim.

In 1296 Friedrich sold some land to the Bebenhausen Abbey.

Marriage and issue 
In 1281, Friedrich married Kunigunde (1265–1310), the daughter of Margrave Rudolf I of Baden, with whom he had the following children:
 Albrecht
 Kunigunde (died between 1380 and 1384), abbess of Lichtenthal Abbey
 Friedrich VII (d. 1309), Count of Zollern
 married in 1298 to Countess Eufemia of Hohenberg (d. 1333)
 Friedrich VIII "Easter Sunday" (d. 1333), Count of Hohenzollern
 Sophia (died after 1300), a nun at Stetten Abbey
 Friedrich († 1361)

See also 
 House of Hohenzollern

References 
 Ottmar F. Schönhuth: Die Burgen, Klöster, Kirchen und Kapellen Württembergs und der Preußisch-Hohenzollern'schen Landestheile mit ihren Geschichten, Sagen und Mährchen, Fischhaber, 1860, p. 292
 Graf Rudolph Stillfried-Alcántara, Traugott Maercker: Hohenzollerische Forschungen, C. Reimarus, 1847, p. 169 ff

External links 
 http://thepeerage.com/p10881.htm#i108805

Counts of Hohenzollern
Counts of Zollern
House of Hohenzollern
13th-century births
1298 deaths
Year of birth unknown
13th-century German nobility